The 1951 Texas A&M Aggies baseball team represented Texas A&M University in the 1951 NCAA baseball season. The Aggies played their home games at Kyle Baseball Field. The team was coached by Beau Bell in his 1st year at Texas A&M.

The Aggies won the District VI playoff to advance to the College World Series, where they were defeated by the Utah Redskins.

Roster

Schedule 

! style="" | Regular Season
|- valign="top" 

|- align="center" bgcolor="#ccffcc"
| 1 || March 2 ||  || Kyle Baseball Field • College Station, Texas || 8–7 || 1–0 || –
|- align="center" bgcolor="#ffcccc"
| 2 || March 3 || B. A. M. C. || Kyle Baseball Field • College Station, Texas || 1–2 || 1–1 || –
|- align="center" bgcolor="#ccffcc"
| 3 || March 14 ||  || Kyle Baseball Field • College Station, Texas || 3–1 || 2–1 || –
|- align="center" bgcolor="#ffcccc"
| 4 || March 17 || at Houston || Buffalo Stadium • Houston, Texas || 3–7 || 2–2 || –
|- align="center" bgcolor="#ccffcc"
| 5 || March 20 ||  || Kyle Baseball Field • College Station, Texas || 16–8 || 3–2 || –
|- align="center" bgcolor="#ffcccc"
| 6 || March 22 || at B. A. M. C. || Unknown • San Antonio, Texas || 4–12 || 3–3 || –
|- align="center" bgcolor="#ccffcc"
| 7 || March 23 || at B. A. M. C. || Unknown • San Antonio, Texas || 10–3 || 4–3 || –
|- align="center" bgcolor="#ccffcc"
| 8 || March 28 ||  || Kyle Baseball Field • College Station, Texas || 2–0 || 5–3 || –
|- align="center" bgcolor="#ffcccc"
| 9 || March 29 || Minnesota || Kyle Baseball Field • College Station, Texas || 0–1 || 5–4 || –
|- align="center" bgcolor="#ccffcc"
| 10 || March 31 || El Dorado Oilers || Kyle Baseball Field • College Station, Texas || 7–4 || 6–4 || –
|-

|- align="center" bgcolor="#ffcccc"
| 11 || April 3 ||  || Kyle Baseball Field • College Station, Texas || 2–3 || 6–5 || 0–1
|- align="center" bgcolor="#ccffcc"
| 12 || April 6 ||  || Kyle Baseball Field • College Station, Texas || 3–0 || 7–5 || 1–1
|- align="center" bgcolor="#ccffcc"
| 13 || April 7 || SMU || Kyle Baseball Field • College Station, Texas || 3–0 || 8–5 || 2–1
|- align="center" bgcolor="#ffcccc"
| 14 || April 9 ||  || Kyle Baseball Field • College Station, Texas || 4–5 || 8–6 || 2–2
|- align="center" bgcolor="#ccffcc"
| 15 || April 14 ||  || Kyle Baseball Field • College Station, Texas || 7–2 || 9–6 || 3–2
|- align="center" bgcolor="#ccffcc"
| 16 || April 17 || at Sam Houston State || Unknown • Huntsville, Texas || 13–3 || 10–6 || 3–2
|- align="center" bgcolor="#ffcccc"
| 17 || April 21 || at  || Clark Field • Austin, Texas || 10–14 || 10–7 || 3–3
|- align="center" bgcolor="#ffcccc"
| 18 || April 27 || at TCU || Unknown • Fort Worth, Texas || 6–7 || 10–8 || 3–4
|- align="center" bgcolor="#ccffcc"
| 19 || April 28 || at TCU || Unknown • Fort Worth, Texas || 8–1 || 11–8 || 4–4
|- align="center" bgcolor="#ccffcc"
| 20 || April 30 || at SMU || Unknown • Dallas, Texas || 5–4 || 12–8 || 5–4
|-

|- align="center" bgcolor="#ccffcc"
| 21 || May 4 || at Baylor || Unknown • Waco, Texas || 9–0 || 13–8 || 6–4
|- align="center" bgcolor="#ccffcc"
| 22 || May 5 || at Baylor || Unknown • Waco, Texas || 12–6 || 14–8 || 7–4
|- align="center" bgcolor="#ccffcc"
| 23 || May 11 || at Rice || Unknown • Houston, Texas || 13–2 || 15–8 || 8–4
|- align="center" bgcolor="#ccffcc"
| 24 || May 12 || at Rice || Unknown • Houston, Texas || 16–9 || 16–8 || 9–4
|- align="center" bgcolor="#ccffcc"
| 25 || May 17 || Texas || Kyle Baseball Field • College Station, Texas || 4–2 || 17–8 || 10–4
|- align="center" bgcolor="#ccffcc"
| 26 || May 18 || Texas || Kyle Baseball Field • College Station, Texas || 4–1 || 18–8 || 11–4
|-

|-
|-
! style="" | Postseason
|- valign="top"

|- align="center" bgcolor="#ccffcc"
| 27 || May 23 || at  || UA Field • Tucson, Arizona || 5–4 || 19–8 || 11–4
|- align="center" bgcolor="#ffcccc"
| 28 || May 24 || at Arizona || UA Field • Tucson, Arizona || 4–21 || 19–9 || 11–4
|- align="center" bgcolor="#ccffcc"
| 29 || May 25 || at Arizona || UA Field • Tucson, Arizona || 14–2 || 20–9 || 11–4
|-

|- align="center" bgcolor="#ffcccc"
| 30 || June 13 || vs Springfield || Omaha Municipal Stadium • Omaha, Nebraska || 1–5 || 20–10 || 11–4
|- align="center" bgcolor="#ccffcc"
| 31 || June 14 || vs Ohio State || Omaha Municipal Stadium • Omaha, Nebraska || 3–2 || 21–10 || 11–4
|- align="center" bgcolor="#ffcccc"
| 32 || June 15 || vs Utah || Omaha Municipal Stadium • Omaha, Nebraska || 8–15 || 21–11 || 11–4
|-

Awards and honors 
Hank Candelari
 All-Southwest Conference

John DeWitt
 All-Southwest Conference

Pat Hubert
 First Team All-American
 All-Southwest Conference

Yale Lary
 All-Southwest Conference

Al Ogletree
 All-Southwest Conference

Guy Wallace
 All-Southwest Conference

References 

Texas A&M Aggies baseball seasons
Texas A&M Aggies baseball
College World Series seasons
Texas A&M
Southwest Conference baseball champion seasons